is a bus terminal at Minamibōsō in Japan. The bus terminal is used by JR Bus and Nitto Kotsu.

History

In 2017, a new building was opened.  The bus terminal is situated near Nojimazaki Lighthouse and Shirahama Onsen.

Two routes connect Tateyama Station and Tokyo Station) operated by JR Bus Kanto; four routes bound that connect Awa-Kamogawa Station or Chiba Station and operated by Nitto Kotsu.

Facilities
Ticket selling for Highway Bus Boso Nanohana is operated by JR Bus and various commutation tickets and the book of coupon tickets that can be used to a lot of sections and route buses around Tateyama.

Bus routes

IC cards are not accepted on any bus route.

Surrounding areas
There is Nojimazaki Lighthouse, it takes 10 minutes on foot from the bus terminal.

References

External links
 Official website

Bus stations in Japan
Transport infrastructure in Chiba Prefecture
Minamibōsō
Buildings and structures in Chiba Prefecture
1933 establishments in Japan